Let It Out may refer to:

Albums and DVDs
 Let It Out (Kraan album) or the title song, 1975
 Let It Out, an album by Ashlyne Huff, 2011
 Let It Out (Let It All Hang Out), an album by the Hombres, or the title song (see below), 1967
 Let It Out, a DVD by Hoobastank, 2004

Songs
 "Let It Out" (Miho Fukuhara song), 2009
 "Let It Out" (Switchfoot song), 2014
 "Let It Out (Let It All Hang Out)", by the Hombres, 1967; covered by Jonathan King, 1970
 "Let It Out", by Frances from Things I've Never Said, 2017
 "Let It Out", by George Canyon from What I Do, 2008
 "Let It Out", by Godsmack from When Legends Rise, 2018
 "Let It Out", by Hoobstank from The Reason, 2003
 "Let It Out", by In Fear and Faith from Imperial, 2010